Argavand may refer to:
Argavand, Ararat, Armenia
Argavand, Armavir, Armenia